Louis L. Pierron was a member of the Wisconsin State Assembly.

Biography
Pierron was born on March 10, 1870, in Belgium (town), Wisconsin. He at one point attended high school in St. Francis, Wisconsin.

Career
Pierron was a member of the Assembly during the 1919 and 1921 sessions. Other positions he held include school board chairman and treasurer, as well as justice of the peace. He was a Republican.

References

People from Belgium, Wisconsin
People from Milwaukee County, Wisconsin
Republican Party members of the Wisconsin State Assembly
School board members in Wisconsin
American justices of the peace
1870 births
Year of death missing